Me most often refers to:
 Me (pronoun), the first-person singular pronoun, referring to the speaker

Me, M.E. or ME may also refer to:

Calendar
 Myanmar Era, a lunisolar system traditionally used in Myanmar

Computing
 .me, the top-level Internet domain for Montenegro
 Me (computer science), a keyword in some programming languages
 Windows Me, a computer operating system
 MobileMe or me.com, a subscription-based collection of online services
 Intel Management Engine, firmware and software for Intel CPUs
 Mix/Effects, a section of a vision mixer

Language
 Me (cuneiform), a sign in cuneiform writing
 Me (kana), a letter in Japanese script
 Me (pronoun), the object form of English's first-person singular pronoun
 Middle English, a historic phase of the English language

Music
 ME (band), an Australian rock group 2008–2015
 Me, a solfège syllable, for a note of the third scale degree

Albums
 Me (Biff Bang Pow! album), 1991
 Me (Buck Brothers album), 2007
 Me (Empress Of album), 2015
 Me (Fiona album), 2005
 Me (James McCartney album), 2013
 Me (Jo Dee Messina album) or the title song, 2014
 Me (The Mekons album), 1998
 Me (Misono album), 2010
 Me (Ray Stevens album) or the title song, 1983
 Me (Sandie Shaw album), 1965
 Me (Super Junior-M album) or the title song, 2008
 Me..., by Emi Hinouchi, 2008

EPs
 Me (Aoxuan Lee EP), 2019
 Me (RaeLynn EP), 2015
 Me?, by Park Ye-eun, 2014
 Me, by Laura Marano, or the title song, 2019

Songs
 "Me" (Bill Anderson song), 1964
 "Me" (CLC song), 2019
 "Me" (Paula Cole song), 1998
 "Me" (Tamia song), 2007
 "Me!", by Taylor Swift, 2019
 "Me", by Axium from Matter of Time, 2002
 "Me", by Pat Boone from Wish You Were Here, Buddy, 1966
 "Me", by Dev from The Night the Sun Came Up, 2011
 "Me", by Erykah Badu from New Amerykah Part One (4th World War), 2008
 "M.E.", by Gary Numan from The Pleasure Principle, 1979
 "Me", by Kina, 2000
 "Me", by Staind from Dysfunction, 1999
 "Me", by Summer Walker from Over It, 2019
 "Me", by the 1975 from Music for Cars, 2013
 "Me (Without You)", by Andy Gibb from Andy Gibb's Greatest Hits, 1980

People and titles
 Maître, a French honorific used for legal professionals
 Maritime Law Enforcement Specialist, a U.S. Coast Guard rating
 Mary Engelbreit, artist who signs paintings with an "ME" moniker
 Master of Engineering, an academic degree

Places
 La Mé, a region in Lagunes District, Ivory Coast
 ME postcode area, a group of postal districts around Medway, Kent, England
 Montenegro's ISO 3166-1 alpha-2 country code
 Maine's U.S. postal abbreviation and ISO 3166-2 code

Publications
Me (book), Elton John's 2019 autobiography
Me (Moth), a 2021 novel in verse by Amber McBride
 Me: Stories of My Life, Katharine Hepburn's 1996 autobiography

Religion
 Me (mythology), a decree of the gods in Sumerian religion
 Me, an honorific form of bap offered to the deceased in Korean ancestral rites
 Methodist Episcopal Church, former religious denomination

Science and medicine
 Electron rest mass (me), the mass of a stationary electron
 Malic enzyme
 Methyl group, a hydrocarbon group of atoms
 Symbol for a metal in generalized chemical reaction equations or structure formulas
 Myalgic encephalomyelitis, an illness also known as chronic fatigue syndrome (ME or ME/CFS)
 Medical examiner
 Mechanical energy, in physics

Television

 ME (TV channel) or For You, a defunct Italian TV channel formerly known as ME
 Me (South African TV channel)
 Me (Doctor Who) or Ashildr, a fictional character in the sci-fi TV series

Transportation
 Middle East Airlines (by IATA code)
 Morristown and Erie Railway, New Jersey, US (by reporting mark)
Metra Electric District, a line on Chicago's Metra commuter rail system

See also
 Mae (disambiguation)
 Mai (disambiguation)
 Me TV (disambiguation)
 Mee (disambiguation)
 Mée (disambiguation)
 Mees (disambiguation)
 Mei (disambiguation)
 MES (disambiguation)
 Mi (disambiguation)
 Mii (disambiguation)
 Myself (disambiguation)
 Self (disambiguation)